The Little Princess is a 1917 American silent film directed by Marshall Neilan based upon the 1905 novel A Little Princess by Frances Hodgson Burnett. This version is notable for having been adapted by famed screenwriter Frances Marion.

Plot
As described in a film magazine, Sara Crewe (Pickford) is treated as a little princess at the Minchin boarding school for children until it is learned that her father has lost his entire fortune, and she is made a slave (a household servant). She and Becky (Pitts), another slave, become close friends who share their joys and sorrows. Christmastime draws near and the girls watch the preparations wistfully. Their loneliness arouses the sympathy of a servant of the rich Mr. Carrisford. On the night before Christmas he prepares a spread for the slaveys in their attic. He calls his master Mr. Carrisford (von Seyffertitz) to watch their joy, but both are witness to the slaveys being abused and whipped by Miss Minchin (Griffith). Carrisford interferes and learns that Sara is the daughter of his best friend. He adopts Sara and Becky and in their new home they have a real Christmas.

The film opens with Sarah's father moving back to London after serving in the British Army in India. She is opposed to leaving the luxurious life of an officer's child with a large house and many servants, and is initially shy when enrolled in Miss Minchin's School. Her reputation as "the little princess" precedes her and the other girls are fascinated with her tales of life in India. The girls sneak into Sarah's room at night to listen to her stories.  One night, she tells "Ali Baba and the Forty Thieves" which becomes a story within a story with elaborate exotic sets and costumes.

When Miss Minchin is informed that Sara's father has died and lost his fortune, she is stripped of her possessions and accommodations, forced to work as a servant and live in the attic with Becky, the school's existing servant girl. While the other students and Miss Minchin treat Becky poorly, Sara had always been kind and generous and the two become close friends.

Mr. Carrisford is the school's neighbor; his house is so close it is possible to walk across the cornices from his attic window to Sara and Becky's. Mr. Carrisford's Indian servant loses his pet monkey, which escapes to Sara. Upon their meeting he realizes she had spent time in India in a wealthy family and takes pity on her circumstances. While the girls work tirelessly to prepare a Christmas feast for the students and staff, Mr. Carrisford's servant lays out a banquet for Sara and Becky, with an elaborate tablecloth and silver. Miss Minchin discovers this and accuses them of stealing, but are interrupted by Carrisford and his servant crossing the cornice. Carrisford learns Sara's identity and reveals himself to have been her father's best friend, who had persuaded him to invest his fortune in a risky business venture. He died believing he was destitute and had been betrayed by his friend, while Carrisford had been ill and was unable to arrive in time to tell him that the venture was a success. Sara was the heiress to a million pound fortune.

In the final scene, Becky and Sara are invited to live with Mr. Carrisford and they host a Christmas party for a group of poor children. Sara's parents (as ghosts) look on approvingly.

Cast
 Mary Pickford as Sara Crewe
 Katherine Griffith as Miss Minchin
 Norman Kerry as Captain Richard Crewe
 Anne Schaefer as Amelia Minchin
 ZaSu Pitts as Becky
 Gertrude Short as Ermengarde
 Theodore Roberts as Cassim
 Gustav von Seyffertitz as Mr. Carrisford
 Loretta Blake as Lavinia
 George A. McDaniel as Ram Dass

References

External links

 
 AllMovie.com
 
 

1917 films
1917 drama films
Silent American drama films
American silent feature films
American black-and-white films
Films based on A Little Princess
Articles containing video clips
Films with screenplays by Frances Marion
Films set in India
Films set in the British Raj
1910s English-language films
Films directed by Marshall Neilan
1910s American films